The Kelantan Museum is a museum in Kota Bharu, Kelantan, Malaysia.

History
The museum was established in the former building of Kota Bharu Municipal Council. In 1988, the building interior was renovated by adding an extra half story and rooms for the museum exhibition. It was finally opened on 6 August 1990 by Kelantan Sultan Ismail Petra.

Exhibitions
The museum showcases the history, culture and art of Kelantan.

Events
The museum regularly holds various events, such as book launches etc.

See also
 List of museums in Malaysia
 List of tourist attractions in Kelantan

References

External links

 

1990 establishments in Malaysia
Kota Bharu
Museums established in 1990
Museums in Kelantan